Here, Under Protest is the seventh full-length album by Californian punk rock band Swingin' Utters.

Track listing
All songs written by Darius Koski, except where noted.
 "Brand New Lungs" – 2:43
 "Taking The Long Way" – 1:59 
 "Bent Collector of 1,000 Limbs" (Koski, Steve Bonnel) – 2:32 
 "Kick It Over" – 2:30
 "Good Things" – 2:04
 "Sketch Squandered Teen" (Koski, Johnny Bonnel) – 2:03
 "Heavy Head" – 2:29 
 "(You've Got To) Give It All To The Man" (Koski, Spike Slawson) – 1:10 
 "Time On My Own" – 2:48 
 "Lepers, Thieves And Whores" (Koski, Bonnel) – 2:18
 "Blindness Is Kind" – 2:59
 "Reds And Blues And Beggars" – 2:16
 "Scary Brittle Frame" (Koski, Bonnel) – 2:13
 "Effortless Amnesiac" – 3:35

Personnel
 Johnny Bonnel (vocals)
 Darius Koski (guitar, vocals)
 Jack Dalrymple (guitar, vocals)
 Greg McEntee (drums)
 Spike Slawson (bass, vocals)

External links
Official Swingin' Utters homepage
[ Swingin' Utters at Allmusic]

References

Swingin' Utters albums
Fat Wreck Chords albums
2011 albums